Nabil Ben Yadir (born 24 February 1979) is a Belgian film director, screenwriter and producer.

Career
Ben Yadir made his feature-length directorial debut in 2009 with The Barons, which he also co-wrote with Laurent Brandenbourger and Sébastien Fernandez. The film was nominated for six Magritte Awards, including Best Director and Best Screenplay.
His second feature, The Marchers, was screened in Official Competition at Cannes. Filming for a political thriller, Blind Spot (Dode Hoek), set against Belgium's Flemish-French divide, began in the spring of 2014.

Before becoming a filmmaker, Ben Yadir worked on an assembly line for Volkswagen. He spent "months on end doing exactly the same thing". This influenced his choice to select a different genre for each of his films: "now I make sure that I always take new challenges and adopt new approaches". Ben Yadir has a film production company called L'Antilope Joyeuse. His next film, Animals (2021), was based on the 2012 murder of gay man Ihsane Jarfi.

Filmography

References

External links

Living people
Belgian male actors
Belgian film directors
Belgian screenwriters
Belgian people of Moroccan descent
Moroccan film directors
Moroccan screenwriters
Year of birth missing (living people)